John B. Heim (July 15, 1848 – November 2, 1919) was an American politician.

Heim was born in Rochester, New York. He moved to Madison, Wisconsin in 1858 and was in the bookbinding business. In 1881, Heim served on the Madison Common Council and was also Mayor of Madison, Wisconsin from 1912 to 1913. In 1915, Heim served in the Wisconsin State Assembly and was a Democrat. Heim died in Madison, Wisconsin.

References

Politicians from Rochester, New York
Democratic Party members of the Wisconsin State Assembly
Wisconsin city council members
Mayors of Madison, Wisconsin
1848 births
1919 deaths
19th-century American politicians
Bookbinders